Hanalala was the Indonesian version of the manga magazines Hana to Yume and LaLa. The magazine was started in 2006. It was published by Elex Media Komputindo, a component of Kompas Gramedia Group, the largest comic publisher in Indonesia. Publication was discontinued with a Farewell Edition (vol 55) on 2 December 2010.

Manga Series

See also 

 List of manga magazines published outside of Japan

References

2006 establishments in Indonesia
2010 disestablishments in Indonesia
Anime and manga magazines
Defunct magazines published in Indonesia
Indonesian comics titles
Magazines published in Indonesia
Indonesian-language magazines
Magazines established in 2006
Magazines disestablished in 2010
Monthly magazines published in Indonesia